Won-il Rhee (2 November 1960 – 11 January 2011) was a South Korean digital art curator.  He was born and died in Seoul.

Rhee was the artistic director in 2002 and 2006 of the Media City Seoul Biennale. He was the leading curator of the Total Museum of Art and co-ordinator of the Korean Pavilion for the 1995 Venice Biennale. Also, he served as executive head of the exhibition team for the Third Gwangju Biennale and was one of the curators of the Fourth Prague Biennale in 2009.

From 1996 to 2002, he was head curator at the Sung-Kok Museum of Art and in 2002 he was appointed artistic director of the Media City Seoul Biennale. In 2003, he became chief curator at the Seoul Museum of Art. He also served as the Asian Editor for art publications such as Contemporary Magazine in London and Flash Art in Milan.

Curatorial projects
Media City Seoul Biennale, Seoul, Korea, 2002 & 2006
ElectroScape, Zendai Museum of Modern Art, Shanghai, China, 2005
Co-Curator for Shanghai COOL Duolun Museum of Art, Shanghai, 2005
Advisory Programmer to DMC, Seoul, 2004
Curator for Portrait-Landscape, Gwangju, 2005
Curator for City Net Asia, Seoul, 2003
Curator for the Asia-Oceania-Korea Section of the Gwangju Biennale, 2004
Curator of the Asian Section at the Lodz Biennale, Lodz, Poland, 2004
Curator for Digital Sublime, Taiwan, 2004
Curator of Grounding Reality-25 Young Chinese Artists, Seoul Arts Center, Seoul, 2005
Curator of Silent Power-German Expressionists, Zendai Museum of Modern Art, Shanghai, 2006
Curator of Thermocline of Art: Asian Waves, ZKM, Karlsruhe, 2007
Curator of Julian Schnabel, World Art Museum, Beijing, China, 2007
Co-Curator of Asia-Europe Mediations, Poznan Museum, Poland
Co-Curator of BIACS 3: 3rd International Biennial of Seville, YOUniverse, 2008
Artistic Director of DIGIFESTA 2010, Gwangju Biennial, Korea
Curator of Nanjing Documenta 2010, China
Co-Curator of Prague Biennial, 2009–2013, Czech Republic
Co-Commissioner of Vancouver Olympic Sculpture Biennial 2009-2011, Canada

On January 11, 2011, Rhee died suddenly of a heart attack.

External links
  On June 24, 2006, Wonil Rhee speaking at the podium of the conference The Global Challenge of Art Museums. Remarks on the question What is Contemporary Art?

Footnotes

References
 Christiane Paul, Digital Art, Thames & Hudson Ltd.
 Frank Popper, Ecrire sur l'art : De l'art optique a l'art virtuel, L'Harmattan 2007.
 Robert C. Morgan, Digital Hybrids, Art Press volume #255.
 ZKM Karlsruhe, Thermocline of Art: Asian Waves, exhibition website, 2007.

South Korean art critics
2011 deaths
Cultural historians
Postmodern theory
Postmodernists
Art curators
People from Seoul
1960 births